is a railway station in the city of Shimada, Shizuoka Prefecture, Japan,  operated by the Ōigawa Railway.

Lines
Fukuyo Station is on the Ōigawa Main Line and is 12.3 km from the terminus of the line at Kanaya Station.

Station layout
The station has a single island platform and a wooden passenger building connected to the platform by a level crossing. The station is staffed.

Adjacent stations

|-
!colspan=5|Ōigawa Railway

Station history
Fukuyō Station was opened on December 1, 1929. The station building was rebuilt in 1998.

Passenger statistics
In fiscal 2017, the station was used by an average of 27 passengers daily (boarding passengers only).

Surrounding area
Japan National Route 473

See also
 List of Railway Stations in Japan

References

External links

 Ōigawa Railway home page

Stations of Ōigawa Railway
Railway stations in Shizuoka Prefecture
Railway stations in Japan opened in 1929
Shimada, Shizuoka